The Golden Sheaf Award for the Best of Festival production is presented by the Yorkton Film Festival.

History
In 1947 the Yorkton Film Council was founded.  The first Yorkton Film Festival was held in 1950. During the first few festivals, the films were adjudicated by audience participation through ballot casting and winners were awarded 'Certificates of Merit' by the film council.  

In 1958 the film council established the Yorkton Film Festival Golden Sheaf Award for the category Best of Festival; awarded to the best overall film in the festival.  The winner of this award is determined by a panel of jurors chosen by the film council to select the most outstanding production in the festival. The competition was held biennially from 1958 until 1979 and has been held annually since 1980. The only exceptions have been in 1979 when there was no overall best film selected and in 1988 and 1994 when there were co-winners selected.  In 1981 a new category was added for Best of Festival (Video). As of 2020, the Golden Sheaf Award categories included: Main Entry Categories, Accompanying Categories, Craft Categories, and Special Awards.

Winners

1950s

1960s

1970s

1980s

1990s

2000s

2010s

2020s

References

Awards established in 1958
Yorkton Film Festival awards